Rajneesh Duggal is an Indian film and television actor. He also works as a model. He won the title of Grasim Mr. India 2003 and represented India at the Mr. International 2003 pageant held in London, where he was declared as the 1st runner-up. He also won the Kingfisher 'Model of the Year' award in 2005. He made his Bollywood debut with Vikram Bhatt's horror thriller 1920. In 2014, he participated in reality show Fear Factor: Khatron Ke Khiladi 5 and emerged as the winner.

Career
Rajneesh started his career as a model by winning the title of Mister India World. He also did several TV commercials and ad campaigns like Raymond suitings, Kitkat, Monte Carlo, Wagon R, Yamaha, Videocon and Clinic All Clear.

He made his acting debut in 2008 with Vikram Bhatt's horror thriller movie 1920, alongside Adah Sharma, where he played the lead role of Arjun Rathod, a man who vows to protect his possessed wife. In 2011, Duggal appeared in his next horror thriller Phhir, where he collaborated with Bhatt and Sharma for the second time. He portrayed the role of Kabir Malhotra, a doctor who is in the search of his missing wife (played by Roshni Chopra). In 2012, Duggal appeared in Bhatt's supernatural thriller Dangerous Ishhq co-starring Karishma Kapoor and Jimmy Sheirgill. In 2014, Duggal played the role of Deepak in Rajshri Productions' Samrat & Co.
 
In 2014, Duggal went on to become the winner of the television stunt reality show Khatron Ke Khiladi Season 5.
 
Duggal appeared in the music video "Mohabbat Barsa Dena Tu", alongside Surveen Chawla, from Bhatt's horror movie Creature 3D. In 2015, he played the lead role of Shravan in Bobby Khan's period thriller drama Ek Paheli Leela, co-starring Sunny Leone and Jay Bhanushali. He also appeared in Syed Ahmed Afzal's crime thriller Laal Rang as an inspector, co-starring with Randeep Hooda and Akshay Oberoi in 2016.

Duggal played a young boy from Banaras in the romantic comedy Direct Ishq, with Arjun Bijlani playing the other lead. At the same time, he portrayed the role of a lover in Ek Paheli Leela alongside Sunny Leone. Duggall and Leone went on to do another film together titled Beiimaan Love where he played an obsessive lover.

He also did a special appearance in Laal Rang, where he played S.P. Gajraj Singh.

In 2016, Duggall had two more releases: Saansein, a supernatural thriller; and Wajah Tum Ho, a crime thriller where he played a negative character.

In 2017, he helmed the role of a fearless warrior Varundev and Jaldev in the TV series Aarambh: Kahaani Devsena Ki.
He then played the role of Krishna for the mega TV series Shrimad Bhagwat Mahapuran for Colors in 2019-20.

He also did Life OK's theatrical show Ramleela Ajay Devgn ke Saath as Lord Ram
He also featured in the video of the song by Bombay Vikings named Chodd Do Aanchal.

Rajneesh has been working on a limited series, Aarambh.

Personal life
Rajneesh graduated with a Bachelor of Business Administration degree from Apeejay School of Management and a B.Com from Delhi University.

He is married to Pallavee Duggall, and the couple have a daughter named Teeyaa.

Filmography

Films

Television

References

External links

 
 
 

 
 
 
 

Living people
1976 births
Male actors from Delhi
Indian male models
Male actors in Hindi cinema
21st-century Indian male actors
Indian male film actors
Male actors from Mumbai
Participants in Indian reality television series
Fear Factor: Khatron Ke Khiladi participants